Dow's Lake (formerly known as Carling) is an O-Train station on the Trillium Line, one block west of the intersection of Carling Avenue and Preston Street in Ottawa, Ontario. It is near Dow's Lake the western terminal of the Rideau Canal skating rink (in winters only) and a key site during the Canadian Tulip Festival in May. The station is also near government offices at the area of Carling Avenue and Booth Street. South of Carling, the train enters a tunnel to pass under the Rideau Canal. The station was originally named for nearby Carling Avenue and Sir John Carling.

Facilities

 Accessibility: Yes - 1 elevator
 Washrooms: None
 Nearby: Dows Lake, Booth Street Complex (Natural Resources Canada)

Service

The following routes serve Dow's Lake as of October 6, 2019:

Gallery

References

External links

Carling O-Train station page
OC Transpo Area Map

Trillium Line stations
Railway stations in Canada opened in 2001
2001 establishments in Ontario